S. B. Divya is the pen name of Divya Srinivasan Breed, who writes speculative fiction. She is also an engineer and was the co-editor for Escape Pod, along with Mur Lafferty, through April 8, 2022.

Her debut novella, Runtime, published by Tor.com, was nominated for the 2016 Nebula Award for Best Novella. It was also optioned for film and television adaptation for Escape Artists. The indie game Rogue Wizards, released by Spellbound Studios, features her writing.

Her debut novel, Machinehood, is published by Saga Press, and her short story collection, Contingency Plans for the Apocalypse and Other Possible Situations, is published by Hachette India.

Personal life
Born in Pondicherry, India, as Divya, her given name, S.B. Divya immigrated to the United States with her parents when she was five. Her father was a professor of business administration and her mother was a software engineer. The S in her pen name stands for her patronym, Srinivasan, and the B stands for Breed, her husband's surname. 

Divya holds a BS degree from California Institute of Technology (Caltech) with a major in Computation and Neural Systems, and an M.Eng. in Signal Processing from the University of California, San Diego. Her interests and hobbies include hiking, snowboarding, scuba diving, mountain biking, oil painting, and reading. She has been a disc jockey and is eclectic in her musical tastes.

Career
Divya's first short story, "Strange Attractors", was published in Daily Science Fiction, followed by "The Egg" in the science journal, Nature. This was followed by several short stories  in various magazines, including Analog, Lightspeed, and Mothership Zeta. 

S.B. Divya’s debut novella, Runtime, is about a gruelling race across the Sierra Nevada among those equipped with exoskeletal and internal human enhancements. Human enhancement also features in her first novel, released in March of 2021 titled Machinehood, which is about the conflicts arising from the perceived rights of sentient robots and enhanced humans in a gig economy. 

Her vision of the future in her writings is conditioned by the scientific method that she was schooled in during her years at Caltech. An example of this is the conflict between artificial intelligence and humanity that she envisions in Machinehood. As Ray Kurzweil notes in his review of the book, “From the opening manifesto to its ingenious technologies, Machinehood builds an inspiring and believable vision of the future that is both thought-provoking and hopeful. It will leave you wishing that tomorrow could arrive a little sooner.”

Prior to becoming a full time writer, Divya worked as a signal processing engineer and data scientist for several years. She holds multiple patents in pulse oximetry and signal processing. Her patents in pulse oximetry are antecedents to the Masimo Corp's iSpO2® Pulse Oximeter for home use.

Works

Novels
 
Meru (2023)

Machinehood (2021)

Novellas
 Runtime (2016)

Collections
 Contingency Plans for the Apocalypse And Other Possible Situations (2019)

Anthologies
 Where the Stars Rise (2017) 
 The Gollancz Book of South Asian Science Fiction: Ed. Tarun K. Saint (2019)
 Escape Pod: The Anthology (ed.) (2020)
 Rebuilding Tomorrow (2020)

Short fiction
 Soft We Wake (2019)
 Dusty Old Things (2019)
 Loss of Signal (2018)
 Contingency Plans for the Apocalypse (2018)
 An Unexpected Boon (2017)
 Looking Up (2017)
 Microbiota and the Masses: A Love Story (2017)
 Nava (2017)
 Gaps of Joy, and a Knot for Love (2016)
 The Boy Who Made Flowers (2016)
 Binaries (2016)
 Ships in the Night (2015)
 The Egg (2015)
 Strange Attractors (2014)

Narration

Escape Pod 
 EP569 Safe Harbour(Artemis Rising), by Kristene Perron
 EP593 Planetbound, by Nancy Fulda; read by S.B. Divya & Trendane Sparks
 EP619 A Study in Symmetry, or the Chance Encounter of an Android and a Painter(Artemis Rising), by Jamie Lackey; read by Trendane Sparks & S.B. Divya

PodCastle 
 PC523 Never Yawn Under a Banyan Tree, by Nibedita Sen

Cast of Wonders 
 CW327 Memories of Mirrored Worlds, by Barbara A. Barnett

Beneath Ceaseless Skies 
 BCS246 Sankalpa, by Marie Brennan

Awards and recognition
 Runtime - Nominated for the 2016 Nebula Award for Best Novella
 Escape Pod - Nominated for the 2018 Hugo Award for Best Semiprozine
 Escape Pod - Nominated for the 2020 Hugo Award for Best Semiprozine
 Machinehood - Starred review in the Publishers Weekly

References

External links
Official Website
Blog
Machinehood
Escape Pod
Internet Speculative Fiction Database

Living people
21st-century American women writers
American speculative fiction writers
Year of birth missing (living people)
Place of birth missing (living people)
Indian emigrants to the United States
People from Pondicherry
California Institute of Technology alumni
University of California, San Diego alumni